The Voice Kids is a Dutch talent show produced by Talpa and broadcast on RTL 4 since January 27, 2012. It was hosted by Martijn Krabbé and Wendy van Dijk in seasons 1 to 8. From season 9 to 10, it was hosted by Martijn Krabbé and Jamai Loman.

The show, developed after the success of The Voice of Holland, was made for children aged six to fourteen in the first season, and for those eight to fourteen in later seasons. The program was created by John de Mol, and after achieving success in the Netherlands, the concept was marketed worldwide.

Seasons 1, 2, and 3 all began one week after the last episode of The Voice of Holland of each year. Season 4 was broadcast eight weeks after the finale of The Voice of Holland and aired on Saturday evenings. Seasons 5, 6, 7, 8, 9 and 10 aired directly after The Voice of Holland on Friday evenings.

Fabiënne Bergmans was the winner of the first season. Laura van Kaamwas was the second season's winner and Ayoub Maach won the third. Each received a record deal with 8ball Music, a music video, €10,000 scholarship and a trip to Disneyland Paris. Lucas Van Roekel won the fourth season, receiving a €10,000 scholarship and record deal. Esmée Schreurs won the fifth season and received a €25,000 scholarship, as did Iris Verhoek in the sixth season. Yosina Roemajauw won the seventh season and received a €25,000 scholarship and a single of her own. When she was 11, Silver Metz won the eighth season and received a €25,000 scholarship. Dax Hovius won the Voice Kids in the ninth season, earning a total of 25,000 euros. Emma Kok was the winner of season 10.

Format
The show consists of four phases: production auditions, Blind Auditions, The Battles, and the finale. The production auditions are held for the purpose of selecting good singers and are not filmed. Where in Idols, Popstars, and The X Factor, they would then audition in front of the judges, in The Voice Kids, they do a blind audition, which is similar to the theatre rounds in the previously mentioned talent shows. During the blind auditions, the judges/coaches choose singers based on musicality and voice. Each candidate will have the opportunity to sing a song of their choice for about one and a half minutes. If one of the judges/coaches decides to place the artist in their team, they must press the "I Want You" button. When two or more coaches want the same artist on their team, the artist must choose which coach they want to work with.

When all the teams are full, the artists go to the next round with their coaches. These are "The Battles". Each coach groups three singers together to battle against each other by singing a song chosen by the coach. Every battle has one winner, who is picked by the coach and one other person. The act that wins automatically goes to the "Sing Off". Each team will have five acts in the Sing Off. There, all artists must sing a song from the blind auditions. In each team, only two candidates can be chosen to go to the finals.

After the Sing Offs, there are six finalists (seasons 1-6; four from season 7 onward) who sing a song chosen in consultation with their coach. The audience at home can then vote on which act has to go home. The coaches decide together with the audience at home which act is eliminated; they each have half of the votes.

In the final stage, there is one finalist per team. The winner is named using public televoting.

Coaches and hosts
Marco Borsato, Nick & Simon and Angela Groothuizen were announced as the judges/coaches of the first season in 2011. Roel van Velzen was originally planned to participate in the jury but had to withdraw after he became a father during the scheduled shooting period. The hosts from the adult version, Martijn Krabbé and Wendy van Dijk, were announced as hosts of The Voice Kids. The jury remained the same until the fifth season, while the hosts remained the same until the ninth season.

On April 17, 2015, Nick & Simon confirmed at RTL Late Night that they would quit The Voice Kids because they had many other projects which receive priority. From season 5, Nick & Simon and Angela Groothuizen were replaced by coaches from the adult show, Ilse DeLange and Ali B.

On the seventh season of the show, for the first time in the show's history, The Voice Kids added a fourth coach, Douwe Bob. Douwe Bob was replaced by Anouk in the eighth season.

On 22 February 2019, it was reported that Jamai Loman would replace Wendy van Dijk as host for season 9, as Van Dijk had moved from RTL 4 to SBS6. On 14 June 2019, it was announced that Sanne Hans would replace Ilse DeLange for the ninth season. On 5 June 2020, during the season 9 finale, it was announced that DeLange would return to the panel as a regular coach alongside Ali B and Hans for the tenth season. On 18 July 2020, it was announced that Snelle would replace Marco Borsato for the tenth season.
But in January of 2022, there were assault allegations made against band members and some coaches on the adult version on the show, this caused The Voice, The Voice Kids and The Voice Senior to be suspended until an investigation took place. Coach Ali B was suspended from the show after allegations were made against him, Also, Marco Borsato (Who had already left the show) also had allegations made against him. Plans for new seasons of all three shows will be announced once the allegations are solved.

Timeline of coaches and hosts

Notes

  Ilse was not a coach in season nine, but replaced Marco for the season's Live Shows.

Series overview 
Warning: the following table presents a significant amount of different colors.

Coaches' teams 

 Winner
 Runner-up
 Eliminated in the Final
 Eliminated in the Sing-off
 Eliminated in the Battles

Season 1 (2012)

Season 2 (2013)

Season 3 (2014)

Season 4 (2015)

Season 5 (2016)

Season 6 (2017)

Season 7 (2018)

Season 8 (2019)

Season 9 (2020)

Season 10 (2021)

References

Dutch reality television series
RTL 4 original programming
Television series about children
Television series about teenagers